Henry Arthur Bray (13 June 1891 – 22 March 1966) was an Australian rules footballer who played with St Kilda in the Victorian Football League (VFL).

Notes

External links 

1891 births
1966 deaths
Australian rules footballers from Melbourne
St Kilda Football Club players
Barwon Football Club players
Australian military personnel of World War I
People from North Melbourne